GBU may refer to:

Organizations
 Air Bissau (ICAO code: GBU), the national airline of Guinea-Bissau
 Football Association of Greenland (Grønlands Boldspil-Union), the governing body of association football in the island country of Greenland
 Gabriel Resources (TSX-V code: GBU), a Canadian resource company
 Gaston Berger University, the second university established in Senegal
 Gautam Buddha University, a university established by the Uttar Pradesh Gautam Buddha University Act 2002
 Groupes Bibliques Universitaires, student groups that meet at universities or nearby for in-depth Bible study

Precision-guided munitions "Guided Bomb Unit" 
 GBU-10 Paveway II, an American Paveway-series laser-guided bomb
 GBU-12 Paveway II, an American aerial laser-guided bomb
 GBU-15, an unpowered, glide weapon
 GBU-16 Paveway II, an American Paveway-series laser-guided bomb
 GBU-24 Paveway III, a family of laser-guided bombs
 GBU-28, a 5,000-pound laser-guided "bunker busting" bomb
 GBU-27 Paveway III, a laser-guided bomb with bunker buster capabilities
 GBU-37 GPS-Aided Munition, a GPS-Aided Munition developed for use with the B-2 Bomber
 GBU-39 Small Diameter Bomb, a 250 lb precision-guided glide bomb
 GBU-43/B MOAB, a large-yield bomb
 GBU-44/B Viper Strike, a GPS-aided laser-guided variant of the Northrop Grumman Brilliant Anti-Tank munition
 GBU-53/B, an American air-launched, precision-guided glide bomb

Other
 Countermine System (also GBU-61), an anti-land-mine system consisting of chemical or explosive projectiles
 Gaagudju language (ISO 639-3 code: gbu), an extinct Australian Aboriginal language
 GBU Indoor Stadium, an indoor stadium located in the campus of Gautam Buddha University